José Luciano Nava Namorado (born 23 May 1952) was an international freestyle swimmer from Brazil. Born in Portugal, he became a naturalized Brazilian.

Participated at the inaugural World Aquatics Championships in 1973 Belgrade, where he finished 5th in the 4×100-metre freestyle, along with Ruy de Oliveira, José Aranha and James Huxley Adams, and 13th in the 200-metre freestyle. In the 400-metre freestyle, he did 4:14.37, not going to the finals. He also swam the 4×200-metre freestyle, finishing 11th, with the same team. 

At the 1973 Summer Universiade, in Moscow, Namorado won a bronze medal in the 400-metre freestyle, with a time of 4:12.74, and in the 4×200-metre freestyle, along with José Aranha, James Huxley Adams and Alfredo Machado.

He was at the 1975 Pan American Games, in Mexico City. He won the bronze medal in the 4×200-metre freestyle and 4×100-metre medley. He also finished 8th in the 100-metre freestyle. 

Namorado is a former South American record holder of the 200-metre freestyle. In 1973, he also broke two times the South American record in the 400-metre freestyle. 

He died in the 70s.

References

External links 
 

1952 births
Brazilian male freestyle swimmers
Portuguese emigrants to Brazil
Naturalized citizens of Brazil
Swimmers at the 1975 Pan American Games
Pan American Games bronze medalists for Brazil
Pan American Games medalists in swimming
Universiade medalists in swimming
Universiade bronze medalists for Brazil
Medalists at the 1973 Summer Universiade
Medalists at the 1975 Pan American Games
Living people
20th-century Brazilian people
21st-century Brazilian people